Pavalakodi is a 2003 Tamil language drama film directed by Ram - CP Saravanan. The film stars Vijayasarathy, Robert, Paval, Anumohan, Nirosha and Shaama. The film had musical score by Sirpy and was released on 20 March 2003. This movie didn't do well in the box office. The plot of the movie is copied from the 1998 English movie There's Something About Mary.

Cast

Vijayasarathy  as Shiva
Paval as Paval
Robert as Robert
Anu Mohan as Mohan
Nirosha as Baby
Shaama as Shaamam
 Chaams (uncredited)

Soundtrack

The film score and the soundtrack were composed by Sirpy.

References

2003 films
2000s Tamil-language films